Pablo Alejandro Lunati (born 5 June 1967) is an Argentine former football referee. He refereed 2010 and 2014 FIFA World Cup qualifiers.

After retirement, Lunati confirmed he was a supporter of River Plate; revealing a tattoo of their manager Marcelo Gallardo in the process. Lunati also claimed he had favoured River when refereeing them.

References

1967 births
Living people
Argentine football referees
21st-century Argentine people